Athetoid cerebral palsy, or dyskinetic cerebral palsy (sometimes abbreviated ADCP), is a type of cerebral palsy primarily associated with damage, like other forms of CP, to the basal ganglia in the form of lesions that occur during brain development due to bilirubin encephalopathy and hypoxic–ischemic brain injury. Unlike spastic or ataxic cerebral palsies, ADCP is characterized by both hypertonia and hypotonia, due to the affected individual's inability to control muscle tone. Clinical diagnosis of ADCP typically occurs within 18 months of birth and is primarily based upon motor function and neuroimaging techniques. While there are no cures for ADCP, some drug therapies as well as speech, occupational therapy, and physical therapy have shown capacity for treating the symptoms.

Classification of cerebral palsy can be based on severity, topographic distribution, or motor function. Severity is typically assessed via the Gross Motor Function Classification System (GMFCS) or the International Classification of Functioning, Disability and Health (described further below). Classification based on motor characteristics classifies CP as occurring from damage to either the corticospinal pathway or extrapyramidal regions. Athetoid dyskinetic cerebral palsy is a non-spastic, extrapyramidal form of cerebral palsy (spastic cerebral palsy, in contrast, results from damage to the brain's corticospinal pathways).

Signs  and symptoms
ADCP is often characterized by slow, uncontrolled movements of the extremities and trunk. Small, rapid, random and repetitive, uncontrolled movements known as chorea may also occur. Involuntary movements often increase during periods of emotional stress or excitement and disappear when the patient is sleeping or distracted. Patients experience difficulty in maintaining posture and balance when sitting, standing, and walking due to these involuntary movements and fluctuations in muscle tone. Coordinated activities such as reaching and grasping may also be challenging.  Muscles of the face and tongue can be affected, causing involuntary facial grimaces, expressions, and drooling. Speech and language disorders, known as dysarthria, are common in athetoid CP patients. In addition, ADCP patients may have trouble eating.  Hearing loss is a common co-occurring condition, and visual disabilities can be associated with Athetoid Cerebral Palsy.  Squinting and uncontrollable eye movements may be initial signs and symptoms. Children with these disabilities rely heavily on visual stimulation, especially those who are also affected by sensory deafness.
Cognitive impairment occur in 30% of cases.
Epilepsy occur in 25% of cases.

Cause
CP in general is a non-progressive, neurological condition that results from brain injury and malformation occurring before cerebral development is complete. ADCP is associated with injury and malformations to the extrapyramidal tracts in the basal ganglia or the cerebellum. Lesions to this region principally arise via hypoxic ischemic brain injury or bilirubin encephalopathy.

Hypoxic-ischemic brain injury
Hypoxic-ischemic brain injury is a form of cerebral hypoxia in which oxygen cannot perfuse to cells in the brain. Lesions in the putamen and thalamus caused by this type of brain injury are primary causes of ADCP and can occur during the prenatal period and shortly after. Lesions that arise after this period typically occur as a result of injury or infections of the brain. Cerebral cortex and white matters are often relative spared, so intelligence is often normal.

Bilirubin encephalopathy
Bilirubin encephalopathy, also known as kernicterus, is the accumulation of bilirubin in the grey matter of the central nervous system. The main accumulation targets of hyperbilirubinemia are the basal ganglia, ocular movement nucleus, and acoustic nucleus of the brainstem. Pathogenesis of bilirubin encephalopathy involves several factors, including the transport of bilirubin across the blood–brain barrier and into neurons. Mild disruption results in left cognition impairment, while severe disruption results in ADCP. Lesions caused by accumulation of bilirubin occur mainly in the global pallidus and hypothalamus. Disruption of the blood–brain barrier by disease or a hypoxic ischemic injury can also contribute to an accumulation of bilirubin in the brain. Bilirubin encephalopathy leading to cerebral palsy has been greatly reduced by effective monitoring and treatment for hyperbilirubinemia in preterm infants.  As kernicterus has decreased due to improvements in care, over the last 50 years the proportion of children developing athetoid CP has decreased. In most cases, will have normal intelligence.

Diagnosis

Motor function
Movement and posture limitations are aspects of all CP types and as a result, CP has historically been diagnosed based on parental reporting of developmental motor delays such as failure to sit upright, reach for objects, crawl, stand, or walk at the appropriate age. Diagnosis of ADCP is also based on clinical assessment used in conjunction with milestone reporting. The majority of ADCP assessments now use the Gross Motor Function Classification System (GMFCS) or the International Classification of Functioning, Disability and Health (formerly the International Classification of Impairments Disease, and Handicaps), measures of motor impairment that are effective in assessing severe CP. ADCP is typically characterized by an individual's inability to control their muscle tone, which is readily assessed via these classification systems.

Neuroimaging
Magnetic resonance imaging (MRI) is used to detect morphological brain abnormalities associated with ADCP in patients that are either at risk for ADCP or have shown symptoms thereof. The abnormalities chiefly associated with ADCP are lesions that appear in the basal ganglia. The severity of the disease is proportional to the severity and extent of these abnormalities, and is typically greater when additional lesions appear elsewhere in the deep grey matter or white matter. MRI also has the ability to detect brain malformation, periventricular leukomalacia (PVL), and areas affected by hypoxia-ischemia, all of which may play a role in the development of ADCP. The MRI detection rate for ADCP is approximately 54.5%, however this statistic varies depending on the patient's age and the cause of the disease and has been reported to be significantly higher.

Treatment

Physical and occupational therapy
Physical therapy and Occupational Therapy are staple treatments of ADCP.  Physical therapy is initiated soon after diagnosis and typically focuses on trunk strength and maintaining posture.  Physical therapy helps to improve mobility, range of motion, functional ability, and quality of life.  Specific exercises and activities prescribed by a therapist help to prevent muscles from deteriorating or becoming locked in position and help to improve coordination. Occupational therapy interventions for children with CP emphasises function, and therapists assist with activities of daily living, such as feeding, dressing, bathing and toileting, grooming. Various areas of occupation are also considered, and the occupational therapist may assist the child with pencil grasp and handwriting skills and play. The occupational therapist makes use of everyday activities in order to reach a functional outcome.

Speech therapy
Speech impairment is common in ADCP patients. Speech therapy is the treatment of communication diseases, including disorders in speech production, pitch, intonation, respiration and respiratory disorders.  Exercises advised by a speech therapist or speech-language pathologist help patients to improve oral motor skills, restore speech, improve listening skills, and use communication aids or sign language if necessary.

Drug therapy
Medications that impede the release of excitatory neurotransmitters have been used to control or prevent spasms. Treatment with intrathecal baclofen, a gamma-aminobutyric acid (GABA) agonist, decreases muscle tone and has been shown to decrease the frequency of muscle spasms in ADCP patients. Tetrabenazine, a drug commonly used in the treatment of Huntington's disease, has been shown to be effective treating chorea.

Deep brain stimulation
Deep brain stimulation (DBS) is a technique that uses electrodes placed in the brain to modify brain activity by sending a constant electrical signal to the nearby nuclei. Treatment of muscle tone issues via deep brain stimulation typically targets the global pallidus and has shown to significantly improve symptoms associated with ADCP. The specific mechanism by which DBS affects ADCP is unclear.  DBS of the globus pallidus interna improves dystonia in people with dyskinetic CP in 40% of cases, perhaps due to variation in basal ganglia injuries.

Prognosis
The severity of impairment and related prognosis is dependent on the location and severity of brain lesions. Up to 75% of patients will achieve some degree of ambulation. Speech problems, such as dysarthria, are common to these patients.

References

External links 

Cerebral palsy types
Rare diseases